The men's 4 x 100 metres relay at the 2012 African Championships in Athletics was held at the Stade Charles de Gaulle on 28 and 29 June.

Medalists

Records

Schedule

Results

Round 1
First 3 in each heat (Q) and 2 best performers (q) advance to the Final.

Final

References

Results

Relay 4x100 Men
Relays at the African Championships in Athletics